The Poet Laureate of Texas is the poet laureate for the U.S. state of Texas.

List of Poets Laureate 

1932-1934 - Judd Mortimer Lewis
 1935  Pearle Moore Stevens - On April 8, 1935, the State of Texas honored her by declaring her "Poet Laureate of Texas" and declaring her book of poetry "The Shadows of Dawn" as Book Of The Year.
1934-1936 - Aline T. Michaelis
1936-1939 - Grace Noll Crowell
1939-1941 - Lexie Dean Robertson
1941-1943 - Nancy Richey Ranson
1943-1945 - Dollilee Davis Smith
1945-1947 - David Riley Russell
1947-1949 - Aline B. Carter
1949-1951 - Carlos Ashley
1951-1953 - Arthur M. Sampley
1953-1955 - Mildred Lindsey Raiborn
1955-1957 - Pierre Bernard Hill
1957-1959 - Margaret Royalty Edwards
1959-1961 - J. V. Chandler
1961 - Lorena Simon
1962 - Marvin Davis Winsett
1963 - Gwendolyn Bennett Pappas
1964-1965 - Jenny Lind Porter
1966 - Bessie Maas Rowe
1967 - William. E. Bard
1968 - Kathryn Henry Harris
1969-1970 - Anne B. Marely
1970-1971 - Robby K. Mitchell
1971-1972 - Terry Fontenot
1972-1973 - Mrs. Clark Gresham
1973-1974 - Violette Newton
1974-1975 - Lila Todd O'Neil
1975-1976 - Ethel Osborn Hill
1976-1977 - Florice Stripling Jeffers
1977-1978 - Ruth Carruth
1978-1979 - Patsy Stodghill
1979-1980 - Dorothy B. Elfstroman
1980-1981 - Weems S. Dykes
1982-1983 - William D. Barney
1987-1988 - Ruth E. Reuther
1988-1989 - Vassar Miller
1993-1995 - Mildred Vorpahl Baass
2000 - James Hoggard
2001 - Walter McDonald
2003 - Jack Elliott Myers
2004 - Cleatus Rattan
2005 - Alan Birkelbach
2006 - Red Steagall
2007 - Steven Fromholz
2008 - Larry D. Thomas
2009 - Paul Ruffin
2010 - Karla K. Morton
2011 - David M. Parsons
2012 - Jan Seale
2013 - Rosemary Catacalos
2014 - Dean Young
2015 - Carmen Tafolla
2016 - Laurie Ann Guerrero
2017 - Jenny Browne
2018 - Carol Coffee Reposa
2019 - Carrie Fountain
2020 - Emmy Pérez
2021 - Cyrus Cassells
2022 - Lupe Mendez

See also

 Poet laureate
 List of U.S. states' poets laureate
 United States Poet Laureate

References

External links
 Texas Poets Laureate at Texas State Library and Archives Commission
 Texas Poet Laureate at Library of Congress

 
Texas culture
American Poets Laureate